Brian Power (born 11 April 1974) is an Australian judoka. He competed in the men's extra-lightweight event at the 1996 Summer Olympics.

References

External links
 

1974 births
Living people
Australian male judoka
Olympic judoka of Australia
Judoka at the 1996 Summer Olympics
Sportspeople from Canberra